Rzhevsky (masculine), Rzhevskaya (feminine), or Rzhevskoye (neuter) may refer to:
Poruchik Rzhevsky, a popular character of the Russian jokes, made famous by the film Hussar Ballad
Vladimir Rzhevsky (b. 1987), Russian soccer player
Rzhevsky District, a district of Tver Oblast, Russia
Rzhevskoye Microdistrict, a residential area of the city of Kaliningrad, Kaliningrad Oblast, Russia
Rzhevskoye (rural locality), a rural locality (a settlement) in Kaliningrad Oblast, Russia
Rzhevsky family is a Russian noble family